Subramanian Ramadorai, CBE (born 6 October 1945) was the adviser to the Prime Minister of India in the national council on skill development, Government of India. He held the rank equivalent to an Indian Cabinet Minister. He is also the chairperson of the governing board of the Tata Institute of Social Sciences and Bharathidasan Institute of Management, chairman of Indian Institute of Information Technology, Guwahati and Tata Elxsi. Earlier, he was CEO and MD of Tata Consultancy Services from 1996 to 2009  & Vice - Chairman of Tata Consultancy Services till 6 October 2014 transforming TCS from a company with $400 million revenues and 6000 employees to one of the world's largest software and services company with more than 200,000 employees working in 42 countries and revenues over US$20.0 billion.

Early life and education
Ramadorai was born in Nagpur, India on 6 October 1945 and his family is from Tamil Nadu. His father was a civil servant who served as the accountant general in Tamil Nadu state government while his mother was a housewife. Ramadorai was the fourth of five sons in the family and his ancestors hailed from Tiruvarur.

Ramadorai received his primary and secondary education at D.T.E.A Sr. Sec School, New Delhi. He holds a bachelor's degree in Physics from Hansraj college, Delhi University, a Bachelor of Engineering degree in Electronics and Telecommunications and a Master of Science degree in Computer Science from the University of California, Los Angeles. In 1993, Ramadorai attended the senior executive development program at the MIT Sloan School of Management.

Career
Beginning his career with TCS as a junior engineer in 1969, he rose through the ranks and eventually was charged with setting up TCS' operations in the United States in 1979 in New York, which has since grown to over 40 offices throughout the country. Since taking on the role of CEO, Ramadorai focused his efforts on building relationships with large corporations and academic institutions, planning and directing technology development and acquisitions and overseeing the company's research and development activities. Ramadorai also spearheaded TCS' quality initiatives, taking sixteen of its Development Centers to SEI's CMM Level 5, the highest and most prestigious performance assessment issued by the Software Engineering Institute (SEI). TCS also attained the distinction of being the World's first company to have all Centres assessed as operating at Level 5 of PCMM (People-CMM). He resigned as Vice-Chairman of TCS on 6 October 2014. His term as chairman, Tata Elxsi, has expired, following which he no longer serves on the board of directors of the company. He no longer serves on the board of directors of TATA Communication and any of the subsidiary companies of TCS such as CMC Ltd., Computational Research Laboratories.

Ramadorai was the chairman of Bombay Stock Exchange (BSE), TATA Technologies Limited and TATA Elxsi. He is also on the board of directors of Hindustan Unilever Ltd, Nicholas Piramal India Ltd. He is also the independent director at Hindustan Unilever Limited. On 17 June 2013, AirAsia India announced that he has been appointed as the chairman of the airline.

Awards and recognitions
Ramadorai is a Fellow of the Indian National Academy of Engineering, Fellow of the Institute of Electrical and Electronics Engineers (IEEE), Member of the National Council of the Confederation of Indian Industry (CII), President of the Indo-American Society, Member of the Corporate Advisory Board, Marshall School of Business (USC), and is also on the Advisory and Governing Boards of a number of reputed Indian academic institutions. In 2006, on India's Republic Day, he was awarded the Padma Bhushan, India's third highest civilian honour. In 2004, he won Business India's "Business Man of the Year" award. During 2003, Ramadorai received the Lifetime Achievement Award from the Indore Management Association, the Distinguished Achievement Award from the Indian Institute of Science, Bangalore, and a Fellowship of the Institute of Management Consultants of India. He has also been honoured with CNBC Asia Pacific's prestigious 'Asia Business Leader of the Year' Award in 2002, as well as the 'Management Man of the Year' award by the Bombay Management Association. He was named in June 2002, by Consulting Magazine (USA) as being among the Top 25 Most Influential Consultants in the world, the only Indian CEO on the list. He has been honoured with the position of 'IT Advisor to Qingdao City', People's Republic of China. On 28 April 2009, Ramadorai was awarded the Commander of the Order of the British Empire (CBE). On 31 January 2011, TCS vice-chairman, Ramadorai was appointed by the Indian Government as the advisor to Prime Minister Dr. Manmohan Singh for the National Skill Development Council.

Books authored
On 16 September 2011, his book The TCS Story... and Beyond was published, covering his time at Tata Consultancy Services.

References

Sources

External links
chairman of Indian Institute of Information Technology Guwahati

Businesspeople from Nagpur
Fellow Members of the IEEE
Recipients of the Padma Bhushan in trade and industry
Living people
Tamil businesspeople
1945 births
Tata Consultancy Services people
MIT Sloan School of Management alumni
Indian chairpersons of corporations
Indian Institute of Science alumni